Yennayer is the first month of the Amazigh Year or the Amazigh year used since antiquity by the Imazighen in North Africa. Its first day corresponds to the first day of January of the Julian Calendar, which is shifted thirteen days compared to the Gregorian calendar, i.e. 14 January of every year. He chose 943 BC, the year in which the Amazigh Shoshenq I ascended to the throne of Egypt, as the first year of the Amazigh calendar.

Probably due to a mistake of the first cultural associations asking to return to this traditional celebration, the opinion that the traditional date is the evening of 13 January which is very widespread especially in Morocco, Libya and the Canary Islands, whereas in Algeria it is celebrated on 12 January. On 27 December 2017, Algeria's President Abdelaziz Bouteflika decided to recognize Yennayer as a public holiday celebrated on 12 January of every year. It was celebrated for the first time on 12 January 2018.

Origins 
The Berber Academy was based on the fact that North Africans used to celebrate Yennayer every year, decreeing it as "Amazigh New Year". It was Ammar Negadi who put forward a Berber calendar in 1980, based on a landmark event in the history of the Amazigh people, an undeniable historical fact to make it the zero point of the calendar. His choice fell on the year 950 BC, which corresponds to the date when the Berber king Shoshenq I (ⵛⵛⵏⵈ) (also spelled Chichnaq or Chichneq) was enthroned Pharaoh of Egypt and founded the XXII Dynasty which reigned over Egypt until the year 715 BC. This Berber king had managed to unify Egypt and then invade Judah. It is said of him that he seized the treasures of the Temple of Solomon in Jerusalem in 926 BC. This date is mentioned in the Bible and would be, therefore, the first date of Berber history on written support. King Sheshonq is mentioned in the Bible under the name of Sésaq and Shishaq (שִׁישַׁק) in ancient Hebrew this version remains highly contested. Another version that indicates that the origin of this festival is only a tradition that celebrates the day when we begin to pick the olives

Etymology 
According to one theory, Yennayer means first month, deriving from Amazigh, Yan = One and Ayyur = month. However, because the Julian Berber calendar uses Latin-derived names for all the other months like most European languages, it is perhaps more likely that it derives from Latin Januarius, and is cognate to English "January", Italian gennaio, Spanish enero, and Maltese jannar, and it being derived from yan ayyur is a folk etymology.

The celebration and the tradition 

Yennayer is very widespread in the Maghreb. It is considered as national celebration. The Berber year 2973 corresponds to the present year 2023. It is a public holiday in Algeria.

Imensi umenzu n yennayer (Dinner of the first day of January) 
The meal prepared for this circumstance is hearty and different from the everyday ones. The rites are done in a symbolic manner. They aim to eliminate the famine, to augur the future and the change, and to warm welcome the invisible forces the Berber believed in.

For the preparation of  " imensi n yennayer ", meaning dinner of January, the Kabyle uses the meat of the sacrificed animal (asfel) to complement the couscous, a fundamental element of the Berber culinary art. The participants of the evening in the Souss area (South Morocco) will be able to enjoy the Berber gastronomy by feasting of Tagula, a dish made of barley with rancid butter and Argan oil. And Berkukes, a dish prepared with vegetable and pasta in the form of grains.

An opportunity to exchange wishes for prosperity 
Yennayer symbolizes longevity, and it is often the occasion to include other familiar events: 
 First hair cut for little boys.  
 Marriage under the good omen of Yennayer.  
 Agricultural initiation rites: The Berbers send their children to the farm to pick themselves fruits and vegetables.

Bibliography 
 Encyclopaedia Universalis. France S.A. 1989.
 Paul Couderc. Le calendrier. P.U.F. Que sais-je. no 203
 Jean Servier. Tradition et civilisation berbères. "Les portes de l’année". Éditions du Rocher. août 1985

See also 
 Berber calendar
 Nowruz
 Mawsim
 Tweeza
 Fantasia
 Sebiba
 Wezeea

References

Public holidays in Algeria
Berber culture
Algerian culture
January observances
Festivals in Algeria